The 2021 J3 League, referred to as the  for sponsorship reasons, was the 8th season of J3 League under its current name.

Roasso Kumamoto won the J3 title for the first time in their history, in their debut campaign at the J3 League, just three years after being relegation from the J2 League. They were promoted to the 2022 J2 League alongside Iwate Grulla Morioka. Iwate team won promotion for the J2 League for the first time.

Overview 

There were no relegations from J2 League in 2020 and the number of teams decreased for 2021.

This is first season without three U-23 teams from J1 in 2021 season. Four teams from J2 League automatically relegation for 2021 and two teams from J3 League automatically promotion. J3 League has been scheduled for a expansion to 18 clubs before the 2022 season. This is the last season played with 15 teams.

Changes from the previous season 

2020 was also the last season where U-23 teams played in the professional setup. After two separate stints involving youth clubs in this division. First it was the J.League U-22 Selection in 2014 and 2015, and then three U-23 teams were involved from 2016 to 2020. FC Tokyo U-23 pulled out of the competition prior to the start of the 2020 season. Cerezo Osaka U-23 and Gamba Osaka U-23 were disbanded at the end of 2020 after completing the full season.

Blaublitz Akita and SC Sagamihara were promoted to J2 League, the later being the last club from the original clubs which started the maiden season in 2014 to be promoted from the third division.

One new team was promoted to the professional ranks of Japanese football, Tegevajaro Miyazaki, as runners-up in the 2020 JFL season and were promoted.

Participating clubs

Personnel and kits

Managerial changes

League table

Stadiums
Primary venues used in the J3 League:

Season statistics

Top scorers

Hat-tricks

Attendances

See also

 Japan Football Association (JFA)

League
Japanese association football league system
J.League
2021 J1 League (Tier 1)
2021 J2 League (Tier 2)
2021 Japan Football League (JFL; Tier 4)
2021 Regional Champions League (Promotion playoffs to JFL)
2021 Regional Leagues (Tier 5/6)

Cup(s)
2021 Fuji Xerox Super Cup (Super Cup)
2021 Emperor's Cup (National Open Cup)
2021 J.League YBC Levain Cup (League Cup)

References

External links
Official website, JLeague.jp 

J3 League seasons
3
Japan
Japan